Northern Iron Ore dressing Works (Northern GZK) was built and launched in Kryvyi Rih in 1963 and is one of several iron ore dressing complexes around Kryvyi Rih. Along with Ingulets Iron Ore dressing Works and Central Iron Ore Enrichment Works, it belongs to Ukrainian holding company Metinvest.

Description
The territory of the complex was selected back in 1953 on orders of the Soviet Ministry of Ferrous Metallurgy. In 1958 there was adopted resolution of the Central Committee of the Communist Party of the Soviet Union and the Council of Ministers of the Soviet Union on construction of the complex. In 1963 the complex ore-dressing factory provided its first ore concentrate. The complex was honored with the Lenin's Komsomol of Ukraine. It became a key enterprise of the Soviet Military Industrial Complex.

It is one of the largest iron ore mining enterprises in Europe, producing merchant concentrate with Fe content of 68.4% and pellets with Fe content of 60.5% and 63.5%. Northern GOK is a monopolist in the iron ore market in Ukraine, making up 45% of total iron ore pellets and about 20% of merchant concentrate.

Northern GOK incorporates:
 the Annovskyi and the Pervomayskyi quarries, which in total constitute 3,807 Mtonnes of mineral resources
 cyclical-and-continuous crushing plant, launched in 2006
 two pellet plants
 auxiliary workshops

Awards
 Order of Lenin
 Order of Labour (Czechoslovakia)

Gallery

See also
 List of metallurgical companies in Ukraine

References

External links 
 

Metinvest
Mining companies of Ukraine
Mines in Ukraine
Mining companies of the Soviet Union
Kryvyi Rih